The economy of Morocco is considered a relatively liberal economy, governed by the law of supply and demand. Since 1993, Morocco has followed a policy of privatization of certain economic sectors which used to be in the hands of the government. Morocco has become a major player in African economic affairs, and is the 5th largest African economy by GDP (PPP). The World Economic Forum placed Morocco as the 1st most competitive economy in North Africa, in its African Competitiveness Report 2014–2015.

The services sector accounts for just over half of the GDP. The industry sector– consisting of mining, construction and manufacturing – is an additional quarter. The sectors that recorded the highest growth are the tourism, telecoms, and textile sectors. Morocco, however, still depends to an inordinate degree on agriculture, which accounts for around 14% of GDP but employs 40–45% of the Moroccan population. With a semi-arid climate, it is difficult to assure good rainfall and Morocco's GDP varies depending on the weather. Fiscal prudence has allowed for consolidation, with both the budget deficit and debt falling as a percentage of GDP.

The economic system of the country is characterized by a large opening towards the outside world. In the Arab world, Morocco has the second-largest non-oil GDP, behind Egypt, as of 2017.

Since the early 1980s, the Moroccan government has pursued an economic program toward accelerating economic growth with the support of the International Monetary Fund, the World Bank, and the Paris Club of creditors. From 2018, the country's currency, the dirham, is fully convertible for current account transactions; reforms of the financial sector have been implemented; and state enterprises are being privatized.

The major resources of the Moroccan economy are agriculture, phosphate minerals, and tourism. Sales of fish and seafood are important as well. Industry and mining contribute about one-third of the annual GDP. Morocco is the world's third-largest producer of phosphates (after the United States and China), and the price fluctuations of phosphates on the international market greatly influence Morocco's economy. Tourism and workers' remittances have played a critical role since independence. The production of textiles and clothing is part of a growing manufacturing sector that accounted for approximately 34% of total exports in 2002, employing 40% of the industrial workforce. The government wishes to increase 3 exports from $1.27 billion in 2001 to $3.29 billion in 2010.

The high cost of imports, especially of petroleum imports, is a major problem. Morocco suffers both from structural unemployment and a large external debt.

The youth unemployment rate was 27.2% in 2021. About 80% of jobs are informal and the income gaps are very high. In 2021, Morocco ranked 123rd out of 191 countries in the world on the Human Development Index (HDI), behind Algeria (91st) and Tunisia (97th). It is the most unequal country in North Africa according to the NGO Oxfam.

Macro-economic trend
Morocco is a fairly stable economy with continuous growth over the past half-century. Current GDP per capita grew 47% in the 1960s, reaching a peak growth of 274% in the 1970s. However, this proved unsustainable and growth scaled back sharply to just 8.2% in the 1980s and 8.9% in the 1990s.

This is a chart of the trend of gross domestic product of Morocco at market prices estimated by the International Monetary Fund with figures in millions of Moroccan dirhams.

For purchasing power parity comparisons, the U.S. Dollar is exchanged at over 8 Dirhams. Mean wages were $2.88 per man-hour in 2009.

The following table shows the main economic indicators in 1980–2022. Inflation below 5% is in green.

History

1960–1989
Morocco instituted a series of development plans to modernize the economy and increase production during the 1960s. Net investment under the five-year plan for 1960–64 was about $1.3 billion. The plan called for a growth rate of 6.2%, but by 1964 the growth rate had only reached only 3%. The main emphasis of the plan was on the development and modernization of the agricultural sector. The five-year development plan for 1968–72 called for increased agriculture and irrigation. The development of the tourist industry also figured prominently in the plan. The objective was to attain an annual 5% growth rate in GDP; the real growth rate actually exceeded 6%.

Investment during the 1970s included industry and tourism development. The five-year plan for 1973–77 envisaged a real economic growth of 7.5% annually. Industries singled out for development included chemicals (especially phosphoric acid), phosphate production, paper products, and metal fabrication. In 1975, King Hassan II announced a 50% increase in investment targets to allow for the effects of inflation. The 1978–80 plan was one of stabilization and retrenchment, designed to improve Morocco's balance-of-payments position.

The ambitious five-year plan for 1981–85, estimated to cost more than $18 billion, aimed at achieving a growth rate of 6.5% annually. The plan's principal priority was to create some 900,000 new jobs and to train managers and workers in modern agricultural and industrial techniques. Other major goals were to increase production in agriculture and fisheries to make the country self-sufficient in food, and to develop energy, industry, and tourism to enable Morocco to lessen its dependence on foreign loans. The plan called for significant expansion of irrigated land, for increased public works projects such as hospitals and schools, and for economic decentralization and regional development through the construction of 25 new industrial parks outside the crowded Casablanca-Kénitra coastal area. Large industrial projects included phosphoric acid plants, sugar refineries, mines to exploit cobalt, coal, silver, lead, and copper deposits, and oil-shale development.

1990–2000s

Moroccan economic policies brought macroeconomic stability to the country in the early 1990s but did not spur growth sufficient to reduce unemployment despite Moroccan Government's ongoing efforts to diversify the economy. Drought conditions depressed activity in the key agricultural sector, and contributed to an economic slowdown in 1999. Favourable rainfalls have led Morocco to a growth of 6% for 2000. Formidable long-term challenges included: servicing the external debt; preparing the economy for freer trade with the EU; and improving education and attracting foreign investment to improve living standards and job prospects for Morocco's youthful population.

Macroeconomic stability coupled with relatively slow economic growth characterized the Moroccan economy over the period 2000–2005. The government introduced a number of important economic reforms in that period. The economy, however, remained overly dependent on the agricultural sector. Morocco's primary economic challenge was to accelerate growth in order to reduce high levels of unemployment. The government continued liberalizing the telecommunications sector in 2002, as well as the rules for oil and gas exploration. This process started with the sale of a second GSM license in 1999. The government in 2003 was using revenue from privatizations to finance increased spending. Although Morocco's economy grew in the early 2000s, it was not enough to significantly reduce poverty.

Through a foreign exchange rater anchor and well-managed monetary policy, Morocco held inflation rates to industrial country levels over the past decade. Inflation in 2000 and 2001 were below 2%. Despite criticism among exporters that the dirham has become badly overvalued, the current account deficit remains modest. Foreign exchange reserves were strong, with more than $7 billion in reserves at the end of 2001. The combination of strong foreign exchange reserves and active external debt management gave Morocco the capacity to service its debt. Current external debt stands at about $16.6 billion. Africa :: Morocco — The World Factbook - Central Intelligence Agency

Economic growth, however, has been erratic and relatively slow, partially as a result of an over-reliance on the agricultural sector. Agriculture production is extremely susceptible to rainfall levels and ranges from 13% to 20% of GDP. Given that 36% of Morocco's population depends directly on agriculture production, droughts have a severe knock-on effect to the economy. Two successive years of drought led to a 1% incline in real GDP in 1999 and stagnation in 2000. Better rains during the 2000 to 2001 growing season led to a 6.5% growth rate in 2001. Growth in 2006 went above 9%, this was achieved by a booming real estate market.

The government introduced a series of structural reforms in recent years. The most promising reforms have been in the liberalization of the telecommunications sector. In 2001, the process continued with the privatization of 35% of the state operator Maroc Telecom. Morocco announced plans to sell two fixed licenses in 2002. Morocco also has liberalized rules for oil and gas exploration and has granted concessions for many public services in major cities. The tender process in Morocco is becoming increasingly transparent. Many believe, however, that the process of economic reform must be accelerated in order to reduce urban unemployment below the current rates above 20%.

Recent developments

Morocco's sound economic management in recent years has yielded strong growth and investment grade status and it is weathering the negative impacts of the global crisis impressively well. Morocco is now addressing persistent social problems by reducing absolute poverty rates, investing in human capital through quality education, expanding access to drinking water, and linking rural areas to markets through investment in roads.

Morocco faces challenges on human development outcomes despite progress over the past decade, in particular. Overall illiteracy rates and gender disparity in access to secondary education remain high and the country continues to suffer poor outcomes on infant and maternal mortality. It also needs to diversify its economy, become more competitive, and integrate further into the global economy if it is to reach higher growth levels.

The government has recognized this challenge and has put in place an ambitious process of legal, policy, and institutional modernization that has far-reaching political, economic, and social dimensions. It has designed and is now implementing a comprehensive set of new sector strategies that respond to the overall national vision and that target development challenges with clear, measurable goals and indicators.

Tough government reforms and steady yearly growth in the region of 4–5% from 2000 to 2007, including 4.9% year-on-year growth in 2003–2007 the Moroccan economy is much more robust than just a few years ago. Economic growth is far more diversified, with new service and industrial poles, like Casablanca and Tangier, developing. The agriculture sector is being rehabilitated, which in combination with good rainfalls led to a growth of over 20% in 2009.

2008
In a statement, released in July 2008, the IMF called Morocco "a pillar of development in the region" and congratulated King Mohammed VI and the Central Bank on Morocco's continued strong economic progress and effective management of monetary policy.

Morocco's economy is expected to grow by 6.5% in 2008, according to the Moroccan finance minister. While the forecast is slightly lower than the earlier 6.8% projected growth it still remains quite an achievement considering the circumstances. GDP growth in 2007 was only 2.2% due to a poor harvest caused by prolonged periods of drought; Morocco experienced nonagricultural GDP growth of 6.6 percent in 2007. Inflation is expected to reach 2.9% in 2008 due to the rising costs of energy.
In an increasingly challenging global economic climate, the IMF expects continued nonagricultural expansion of the Moroccan economy.

The global financial crisis affected the Moroccan economy in only a limited way. Morocco may be affected, by the slowdown of international economy, stirred by the global financial crisis, and whose maximum impact on national economy could decrease the GDP growth rate by at least one point in 2009, according to the Bank Al-Maghrib

In a report issued in July 2008, the IMF noted that Morocco's financial sector is sound and resilient to shocks, and that the remarkable fiscal consolidation efforts of recent years have allowed the Moroccan economy to absorb the impact of difficult international economic conditions and increasing global prices for essential commodities such as petroleum and energy.
International economic experts recognize that Morocco's exemplary economic performance is beneficial not only to Moroccans, but also for the nearly 90 million people who live the Maghreb.

Morocco is expected to close the year 2008 with a budgetary surplus ranging between MAD 3 billion and MAD3.5 billion ($348 million to $407 million), despite a difficult international context marked by a severe economic crisis. At the end of November 2008, the state's budget registered a surplus of MAD 3.2 billion ($372 million), while at the end of November 2009, the budgetary surplus is projected at MAD 6.9 billion ($803 million).

The diversification of the Economy includes a multi-disciplinary approach to the development of non-agricultural sector, including the creation of special sectorial zones in industry, tourism and services outsourcing. In addition, reforms to the higher educational system and business law are also planified in the new program-contract signed in 2009 between the government, the banking sector and some zone-development companies. The approach also include a better sustaining of small-business development and prospection of external markets. The objective is to become an emerging industrial country of the likes of Vietnam by 2015.

US Ambassador to the EU noted that:
"Morocco stands out as a model of economic reform for the region and for other developing countries. The kind of economic progress that Morocco has made, and which the rest of the Maghreb has the potential to accomplish, is the best antidote to the new threat of terrorism in the region."

2009
The economy has remained insulated from the worst effects of the world crisis. Due in part to the rebounding of the agricultural sector, which had suffered from a 2007 drought, the economy expanded 5.6% in 2008, with 5.7% growth forecasted for 2009. Morocco's economy is the 61st largest in the world, according to the IMF, though its per-capita GDP is low compared to similarly ranked nations. King Mohammed VI has recently launched two national economic strategies: Plan Maroc Vert and Plan Emergence. The first seeks to create 1.5m jobs in the agriculture sector, and add around €7.65 billion to GDP through €10.8 billion of investments by 2020, while the latter will establish new industrial zones and boost training to increase efficiency.  Additionally, phosphates production, which accounted for more than a third of 2008 exports, is being restructured for greater value.

Morocco's economy is expected to achieve a 6.6% growth in the first quarter of 2009 up from 4.8% in the past quarter thanks to prospects for an agricultural campaign above the average of the past five years.

By the end of December 2008, rainfalls exceeded that of an ordinary year by 106%. This surplus has benefited to all agricultural regions and increased the water stored in dams destined for agriculture to 40.7%. In these conditions and taking into consideration a cereal campaign nearing 70 million quintals, the agricultural value added could increase by 22.2% in the first quarter of 2009, thus contributing 2.9% to the national economic growth.

Due to a decrease of activity among Morocco's main commercial partners, foreign demand of goods destined towards Morocco would moderately slow down in 2009 compared to the 9% rise in 2008. This trend could continue in Q1 of 2009 with a growth rate not exceeding 2% due to a lackluster economic growth outlook and the slowdown of international trade.

2019
In June 2019, Morocco signed two agreements to obtain a loan worth $237 million from the Arab Fund for Economic and Social Development. The loan was taken to fund two investment projects.

2020
On the economic front, the shock of COVID-19 has pushed the Moroccan economy into its first recession since 1995. Economic output contracted by 15.1% in the second quarter of 2020, primarily as a result of the lockdown but also of a sharp reduction in exports caused by the pandemic's disruption to global value chains and the collapse of receipts from tourism. The shock to supply and demand, triggered by the pandemic, has been compounded by the fall in agricultural production due to a severe drought. Although activity picked up in the third and fourth quarters of 2020, the government's preliminary estimates indicate that Morocco's real GDP contracted by 7% in 2020, leading to an increase in unemployment from 9.2% to 11.9%.

Economic growth
Morocco is a fairly stable economy with continuous growth over the past half-a-century. Current GDP per capita grew 47% in the Sixties reaching a peak growth of 274% in the Seventies. However, this proved unsustainable and growth scaled back sharply to just 8.2% in the Eighties and 8.9% in the Nineties.

Real GDP growth is expected to average 5.5% in the 2009–13 period, seen the prospects in the tourism and the non-agricultural industry, as demand growth in the Eurozone — Morocco's key export market and source of tourists is projected to be more subdued. Growth will be well below the 8–10% levels that are widely regarded as necessary to have a major impact on poverty and unemployment. Economic growth will also be intermittently hindered by the impact of periodic droughts on the rain-fed agricultural sector, the country's largest employer.

Agriculture

Agriculture employs about 40% of Morocco's workforce. In the rainy sections of the northeast, barley, wheat, and other cereals can be raised without irrigation. On the Atlantic coast, where there are extensive plains, olives, citrus fruits, and wine grapes are grown, largely with water supplied by artesian wells. Morocco also produces a significant amount of illicit hashish, much of which is shipped to Western Europe. Livestock are raised and forests yield cork, cabinet wood, and building materials. Part of the maritime population fishes for its livelihood. Agadir, Essaouira, El Jadida, and Larache are among the important fishing harbors.

Morocco produced in 2018:

 7.3 million tons of wheat (20th largest producer in the world);
 3.7 million tonnes of sugar beet, which is used to produce sugar and ethanol;
 2.8 million tons of barley (15th largest producer in the world);
 1.8 million tons of potato;
 1.5 million tons of olive (3rd largest producer in the world, behind Spain and Italy);
 1.4 million tons of tomato (15th largest producer in the world);
 1.2 million tons of tangerine (4th largest producer in the world, behind China, Spain and Turkey);
 1 million tons of orange (15th largest producer in the world);
 954 thousand tons of onion;
 742 thousand tons of watermelon;
 696 thousand tons of apple;
 616 thousand tons of sugarcane;
 500 thousand tons of melon;
 480 thousand tons of carrot;
 451 thousand tons of grape;
 319 thousand tons of banana;
 256 thousand tons of chili pepper;
 128 thousand tons of fig (3rd largest producer in the world, only behind Turkey and Egypt);

In addition to smaller yields of other agricultural products.

Land
Morocco is endowed with numerous exploitable resources. It is one of the few Arab countries that has the potential to achieve self-sufficiency in food production. In a normal year, Morocco produces two-thirds of the grains (chiefly wheat, barley, and corn [maize]) needed for domestic consumption.

Morocco exports citrus fruits and early vegetables to the European market. Its wine industry is developed, and the production of commercial crops (cotton, sugarcane, sugar beets, and sunflowers) is expanding. Newer crops such as tea, tobacco, and soybeans have passed the experimental stage, the fertile Gharb plain being favourable for their cultivation. Morocco is actively developing its irrigation potential that ultimately will irrigate more than 2.5 million acres (1 million hectares).

Drought
Unreliable rainfall is a chronic problem that produces drought or sudden floods. In 1995, Morocco's worst drought in 30 years forced Morocco to import grain and adversely affected the economy. Another drought occurred in 1997, and one in 1999–2000. Reduced incomes due to drought caused GDP to fall by 7.6% in 1995, by 2.3% in 1997, and by 1.5% in 1999. During the years between drought, good rains brought bumper crops to market. Good rainfall in 2001 led to a 5% GDP growth rate.

The danger of drought is ever present and still dramatically affects the Moroccan economy, even though Moroccan decisionmakers have recently stated that the economy becomes more diversified and disconnected from rain falls. Especially, cereal yields still depend on considerable variation in annual precipitation. Cereals constitute the essential of the agricultural value added and their production is very sensitive to rain falls. More important is that cereal yields determine not only the aggregate value added in the agricultural sector but also economic growth in general. According to the Moroccan economist, Brahim MANSOURI (Fiscal Policy and Economic Growth: Egypt, Morocco and Tunisia Compared, UNECA, 2008), when drought, measured as a dummy variable computed on the basis of the rate of growth of cereal yield, endangers extremely, the growth rate of real GDP would fall by 10 percent.

Cannabis
Morocco consistently ranks among the world's largest producers and exporters of cannabis, and its cultivation and sale provide the economic base for much of northern Morocco. The cannabis is typically processed into hashish. This activity represents 0.57% of Morocco's GDP. This represented 10% of the total area and 23% of the arable lands of the surveyed territory and 1% of Morocco's total arable land.
On May 26, 2021, the Moroccan Parliament voted to legalize the use of cannabis for medical, as well as cosmetic and industrial purposes.

Morocco is a party to the 1988 UN Drug Convention and in 1992 Morocco passed legislation designed to implement it and its new national strategy against drugs formulated by its National Committee on Narcotics was adopted in 2005. That same year, the International Narcotics Control Board commended the Government of Morocco for its efforts to eradicate cannabis plant cultivation on its territory, which has resulted in the total potential production of cannabis resin in the Rif region decreasing by 10 per cent over the previous year. At the same time the board called upon the international community to support its efforts where possible.

Since the early 2010s a growing debate is taking place in Morocco about decriminalization of Cannabis. Powerful political parties are among advocates of decriminalization, as the Istiqlal Party and the Authenticity and Modernity Party.

Fishing

The fishing industry in Morocco is a leading foreign exchange earner, accounting for 56% of agricultural and 16% of total exports. For a long time the industry has been an economic pillar for the country. The Kingdom is considered the largest fish market in Africa, with an estimated total catch of 1,084,638 MT in 2001.

Industry

The Moroccan industrial sector looks set to continue the strong growth it has enjoyed in recent years. Industrial activity recorded a 5.5% increase in 2007, a slight rise over 2006, when the sector grew by 4.7%. Added value in the sector increased by 5.6% in 2007. Overall the contribution of industrial activity to GDP fluctuates between about 25% and 35% every year, depending on the performance of the agriculture sector. The industrial sector accounted for about 21.1% of employment in 2007 and the sector is a key component of the government's effort to curb unemployment. The sector also attracts high levels of FDI and authorities have announced initiatives to improve the investment climate, with particular attention to off-shoring activities, automotive, aeronautics, electronics, food processing activities, products from the sea and textiles. Other important industrial sectors include mining, chemicals, construction materials and pharmaceuticals. The future of Morocco's industrial segment looks bright, particularly as new initiatives make it more globally competitive in a variety of sectors.

Manufacturing

Manufacturing accounts for about one-sixth of GDP and is steadily growing in importance in the economy. Two particularly important components of Morocco's industrial makeup are processing raw materials for export and manufacturing consumer goods for the domestic market. Many operations date to the colonial period. Until the early 1980s, government involvement was dominant and the major focus was on import substitution. Since then the emphasis has shifted to privatizing state operations and attracting new private investment, including foreign sources.

Processing phosphate ore into fertilizers and phosphoric acid for export is a major economic activity. Food processing for export (canning fish, fresh vegetables, and fruit) as well as for domestic needs (flour milling and sugar refining) is also important, and the manufacture of textiles and clothes using domestically produced cotton and wool is a major source of foreign exchange. Morocco's iron and steel manufacturing industry is small but provides a significant share of the country's domestic needs.

The manufacturing sector produces light consumer goods, especially foodstuffs, beverages, textiles, matches, and metal and leather products. Heavy industry is largely limited to petroleum refining, chemical fertilizers, automobile and tractor assembly, foundry work, asphalt, and cement. Many of the processed agricultural products and consumer goods are primarily for local consumption, but Morocco exports canned fish and fruit, wine, leather goods, and textiles, as well as such traditional Moroccan handicrafts as carpets and brass, copper, silver, and wood implements.

Ownership in the manufacturing sector is largely private. The government owns the phosphate-chemical fertilizer industry and much of the sugar-milling capacity, through either partnership or joint financing. It is also a major participant in the car and truck assembly industry and in tire manufacturing.

Automotive
The automotive sector is already Morocco's leading export sector and has made the Kingdom the leading car manufacturer in Africa. The Kingdom's fast integration into the global economy was also facilitated by numerous free trade agreements with the United States and the European Union. These agreements contributed undoubtedly in a positive way towards the emergence of export activities in the country. 
Foreign direct investment has been expanding as companies are attracted towards the favorable economic situation of the country, government support through their numerous initiatives, such as tax exemptions for the first 5 years and VAT exemptions, modern infrastructure, and a skilled workforce. 
Moreover, the automotive sector has the strongest job creation; 85’000 new jobs were created in the sector between 2014 and 2018, bringing the total jobs in the sector to 158’000.

Morocco has two major "traditional" car manufacturers: Renault and PSA.

The Chinese company BYD is a pioneer when it comes to electric cars and Morocco has signed a memorandum of understanding with the Chinese automaker to set up an electric car factory near Tangier, the first of its kind in the country.

Production and exports are expected to continue to rise thanks to the recent launch of a second production line by Renault. The production of the plants reached 402’000 vehicles in 2018.

Other recent investments in Morocco's automotive sector include PSA Peugeot Citroen's investment of US$615 million in setting up their manufacturing facility which is expected to be operational in 2019. Production at the PSA plant projects to be 200’000 vehicles and boasting a total production capacity of 700’000 cars.

Morocco could soon welcome new names (in two to three years), such as Toyota and Hyundai, having already shown their interest in the attractive conditions offered. Following the example of Renault, they could take advantage of the skilled work pool that has been created and a network of more than 200 automotive suppliers.

Lear Corporation, The American group, with 11 plants in the country is the leading automotive supplier, followed by Yazaki, Sumitomo, and Leoni and many others such as Denso, Kromberg & Schubert, Takata, Furukawa, Fujikura, TE connectivity, Valeo, Faurecia, Daedong System, Hirschmann, Delphi, Magnetti Marelli, COMSAEMTE, Parker, Clarton Horn, Deltrian, Inergy Automotive System, Varroc Lighting System, JTKET, Processos industriales Del Sur... In the medium term, the goal is to attract nearly 50 other industrialists.

New ecosystems have been established such as wiring, vehicle interior and seats, metal stamping, battery, etc.

However, there are still numerous missing elements: sunroofs, leather seats, instrument panels, foundry, screws, tires, radios and screens.

To boost investment in these activities, Morocco intends to encourage Moroccan capital and joint ventures.

Textiles
Textiles form a major industry in Morocco. The European Union is Morocco's top client as regards textile and clothing, with France importing 46% of hosiery, 28.5% of basic textile and 27.6% of ready-to-wear clothing from Morocco, managing director of the Moroccan Export Development Center underlined. Recalling that Morocco's textile and clothing exports totaled some $3.7 billion in 2007, Saad Benabdallah ascribed this performance to the many assets that Morocco enjoys, namely, geographical proximity, flexibility, sourcing skills and the multiple opportunities offered by Free Trade Agreements with the European Union, United States and Turkey.

China's share rose to 46% on average in 2010, and several clothing categories, China is more than 50%. In the European market, the share of Chinese products was 37.7% in 2007. A bond that gives cold sweats to Moroccan exporters who have invested heavily in the sector, The President of CEDITH Jean-François Limantour said in an article that Turkey is the second supplier to Europe with a market share of 12.6%. The share of Morocco fell to 3%.

Mining

The mining sector is one of the pillars of Morocco's economy. It represented a turnover of US$2.7 billion in 2005, including MAD 2.17 billion in exports and 20% of energy consumption. It also employs about 39,000 people with an estimated MAD 571 million in salaries (2005). Morocco produces a number of minerals and metals, most importantly, phosphates, silver and lead.  

Morocco possesses 75 percent of the world's phosphate reserves.  It is the world's first exporter (28% of the global market) and third producer (20% of global production). In 2005, Morocco produced 27.254 million tons of phosphates and 5.895 million tons of phosphate derivatives.

Construction sector
The construction and real estate sectors are also a part of the investment boom in the country.  Increasing public investment in ports, housing development projects, and roads as well as the boom in the tourism sector have been a big shot in the arm for the construction sector.  The rise in construction activities and efforts to improve infrastructure are creating many opportunities for public-private partnerships.  The real estate sector has also been seeing record investments.  In fact, Morocco is being touted as the most popular retirement destination among Europeans because it is inexpensive compared to other European tourist destinations.  Most of the demand in Morocco is for moderate housing, and a decrease in lending rates has made home-ownership easier.

Services
Services, including government and military expenditures, account for about one-fourth of Morocco's GDP. Government spending accounts for fully half of the service economy, despite an ongoing effort on the part of the government to sell much of its assets to private concerns. Since the mid-1980s tourism and associated services have been an increasingly significant sector of the Moroccan economy and by the late 1990s had become Morocco's largest source of foreign currency.

During that time the Moroccan government committed significant resources – by way of loans and tax exemptions – to the development of the tourist industry and associated services. The government also made direct capital investments in the development of the service sector, but since the early 1990s it has begun to divest itself of these properties. Several million visitors enter Morocco yearly, most of them from Europe. Tourists also arrive from Algeria, the United States, and East Asia, mainly Japan.

Tourism

Morocco is a major touristic destination. Tourism is thus a major contributor to both the economic output and the current account balance, as well as a main job provider. In 2008 8 million tourists have visited the kingdom. Tourist receipts in 2007 totalled US$7,55 billion. Morocco has developed an ambitious strategy, dubbed "Vision 2010", aimed at attracting 10 million tourists by 2010. This strategy provides for creating 160,000 beds, thus bringing the national capacity to 230,000 beds. It also aims to create some 600,000 new jobs.

Marrakech continues to be the market leader, but the case of Fez, showing a 20% increase of visitors in 2004, gives hope that better organisation can bring results in diversifying the sector as a whole. Like other regions, Fez has its Centre Regional du Tourisme (CRT), a local tourism body which coordinates the local industry and the authorities. Fez's plan involves a substantial restructuring of the old city and an upgrading of hotel capacity. Improved transport has brought the city into more direct contact with potential visitors. There are now direct flights from France, where previously it was necessary to change plane in Casablanca.

The "Plan Azur", is a large-scale project initiated by king Mohammed VI, is meant to internationalise Morocco. The plan provides for creating six coastal resorts for holiday-home owners and tourists: five on the Atlantic coast and one on the Mediterranean. The plan also includes other large-scale development projects such as upgrading regional airports to attract budget airlines, and building new train and road links.

Thus, Morocco achieved an 11% rise in tourism in the first five months of 2008 compared with the same period last year, it said, adding that French visitors topped the list with 927,000 followed by Spaniards (587,000) and Britons (141,000).
Morocco, which is close to Europe, has a mix of culture and the exotic that makes it popular with Europeans buying holiday homes.

Information technology

The IT sector generated a turnover of Dh7 billion ($910,000m) in 2007, which represented an 11% increase compared to 2006. The number of Moroccan internet subscribers in 2007 amounted to 526,080, representing an increase of 31.6% compared to the previous year and a 100% increase compared to 2005. The national penetration for internet subscription remains low, even though it increased from 0.38% in 2004 to 1.72% in 2007. Yet over 90% of subscribers have a broadband ADSL connection, which is one of the highest ratios in the world. The future of the Moroccan IT sector was laid out in Maroc 2006–12. The plan aims to increase the combined value of the telecoms and IT sector from Dh24 billion ($3.1 billion) in 2004 to Dh60 billion ($7.8 billion) in 2012.

While the telecoms sector remains the big earner, with Dh33 billion ($4.3 billion), the IT and off shore industries should generate Dh21 billion ($2.7 billion) each by 2012. In addition, the number of employees should increase from 40,000 to 125,000. The government hopes that adding more local content to the internet will increase usage. There have also been efforts to add more computers to schools and universities. E-commerce is likely to take off in the next few years, especially as the use of credit cards is gaining more ground in Morocco. Although computer and internet use have made a great leap forward in the past five years, the IT market still finds itself in infancy and offers great potential for further development.

Retail
The retail industry represents 12.8% of Morocco's GDP and 1.2m people – 13% of the total workforce – are employed in the sector. Organised retail, however, represents only a fraction of domestic trade, as shoppers rely on the country's 1151 souks, markets and approximately 700,000 independent groceries and shops. The rapid emergence of a middle class – around 30% of the population – combined with a young and increasingly urban population and a craving for international brands, is rapidly changing the ways Moroccans spend their money. Still average purchasing power remains low overall, forcing retailers to cater to a broad section of the population and to keep prices low. Despite the challenges, the retail sector has strong growth potential. The franchising segment will continue to grow, and while strong local brands are emerging, international brand names will continue to account for the biggest percentage increase in the sector's turnover. Changing consumption habits, increasing purchasing power and the growing number of tourists should boost the development of malls and luxury shopping. However, independent stores and markets should continue to account for most domestic trade in the foreseeable future.

Offshoring
In 2009 Morocco was ranked among the top thirty countries in the offshoring sector. Morocco opened its doors to offshoring in July 2006, as one component of the development initiative Plan Emergence, and has so far attracted roughly half of the French-speaking call centres that have gone offshore so far and a number of the Spanish ones. According to experts, multinational companies are attracted by Morocco's geographical and cultural proximity to Europe, in addition to its time zone. In 2007 the country had about 200 call centres, including 30 of significant size, that employ a total of over 18,000 people.

Finance

In 2007 the economic environment remained conducive to further growth of banking activity in Morocco following a very good year for the sector in 2006. In 2007 macroeconomic growth, excluding the agricultural sector, remained quite robust, providing the background for dynamic growth in banking credits. Total assets of the banking sector increased by 21.6% to MAD 654.7 billion ($85.1 billion), which is above the previous year's high annual growth rate of 18.1%. The structure of the domestic sector has remained steady in the past two years, with the landscape dominated by three major local banks. The state has started to remove itself from the domestic sector by surrendering part of its share capital in public banks. At end-2007 public capital still held controlling stakes in five banks and four financing companies. Meanwhile, foreign ownership in the local financial sector continues to grow, with foreign institutions controlling five banks and eight financing companies as well as holding significant stakes in four banks and three financing companies.

The financial system, though robust, has to take on excessive quantities of low risk-low return government debt at the expense of riskier, but more productive private sector lending. This crowding–out of private sector investment reduces the profitability and growth incentives of the financial sector.

Fitch Ratings affirmed Morocco's long-term local and foreign issuer default ratings of "BBB-" and "BBB", respectively, with a stable outlook. The credit rating agency attributed its classification in part to the "relative resilience of Morocco's economy to the global economic downturn."

Insurance
The insurance sector in Morocco is witnessing dynamic growth, driven foremost by developments in life insurance, which has superseded motor insurance in the past two years as the leading segment of the market with around one-third of total premiums. Behind life and auto insurance, accident, work-related accident, fire and transport insurance were the largest contributors. Total premiums reached Dh17.7 billion ($2.3 billion) in 2007, ranking Morocco as one of the largest insurance markets in the Arab world behind Saudi Arabia and the UAE. The insurance penetration rate is 2.87% of GDP, while the insurance density is $69 per person.

More broadly, the Moroccan insurance sector is already consolidated, with five large players controlling the market. The sector is set to be opened up to foreign competition from 2010 onward, and the consolidation of insurance companies into larger entities should strengthen the local players to better compete with eventual competition from foreign insurers. There is also the possibility that new insurance niches such as takaful (Islamic insurance) and microinsurance products will become part of the Moroccan market in the medium-term, but they are unlikely to appear in the near future.

Media and advertising

According to the Moroccan Advertisers Group, Dh3.9 billion ($507 million) was spent in 2007, a near-fourfold increase on the Dh1.1 billion ($143 million) spent in 2000. There is still room for growth, as the market remains underdeveloped by international standards. Advertising expenditure represented just over 0.6% of GDP in 2007, compared with 1% in Egypt and 1.5% to 2% in EU countries. Morocco's 10 biggest advertising spenders account for about 35% of the total, with telecoms, consumer goods and services companies making up a large percentage of that amount.

Television retained the lion's share of advertising expenditure, with 55% of above-the-line advertising. In a 2006 poll, GAM found that 94% of its members used outdoor advertising, although 81% companied about problems, mainly caused by quality issues and delays. The potential for expansion is huge, and while telecoms should remain the largest advertising segment, fast-growing sectors of the economy such as retail, automobile and real estate are providing advertising companies with new opportunities.

Communications

The telecoms sector increased in value from Dh25.6 billion ($3.3 billion) in 2006 to Dh33.3 billion ($4.2 billion) in 2007. With a workforce of some 41,000 employees, the sector contributes 7% to annual GDP and is one of the country's leading recipients of foreign direct investment (FDI). Under the development plan, the sector should employ 125,000 people by 2012 and contribute 10% of GDP. With the penetration rates of 69.4% from mobile phones and 8.95% for fixed lines, the Moroccan telecoms industry is set to continue to grow. The call centre industry – partially as a result of offshore initiatives, such as Casanearshore and Rabat Technoplis – will continue to expand. However, the worldwide call centre industry is highly competitive and education is the key to success if Morocco truly intends to become a leading international player in this industry.

Telephone system
In the late 1980s and early '90s the government undertook a major expansion and modernization of the telecommunications system. This nearly quadrupled the number of internal telephone lines and greatly improved international communications. In 1996 the state-owned telecommunications industry was opened up to privatization by a new law that allowed private investment in the retail sector, while the state retained control of fixed assets. In 1998 the government created Maroc Telecom (Ittiṣālāt al-Maghrib), which provides telephone, cellular, and Internet service for the country. Satellite dishes are found on the roofs of houses in even the poorest neighbourhoods, suggesting that Moroccans at every social and economic level have access to the global telecommunications network. The Internet has made steady inroads in Morocco; major institutions have direct access to it, while private individuals can connect via telecommunications "boutiques", a version of the cyber cafés found in many Western countries, and through home computers.

Morocco has a good system composed of open-wire lines, cables, and microwave radio relay links. The internet is available. The principal switching centers are Casablanca and Rabat. The national network is nearly 100% digital using fiber-optic links. An improved rural service employs microwave radio relay. The international system has seven submarine cables, three satellite earth stations, two Intelsat (over the Atlantic Ocean) and one Arabsat. There is a microwave radio relay to Gibraltar, Spain and the Western Sahara. Coaxial cables and microwave radio relays exist to Algeria. Morocco is a participant in Medarabtel and a fiber-optic cable links from Agadir to Algeria and Tunisia.

Main lines in use: 3.28 million (2012) : estimation
Mobile cellular: 47.25 million [135% of the total population] (2015) : estimation
Internet users: 21.2 million [60.6% of the total population] (2014): estimation

Radio
AM stations 25,
FM stations 31,
shortwave 11 (2007)
Radio sets: 7.78 million (2007)

Broadband Internet access
Operated by Maroc Telecom. The service started as a test in November 2002 before it was launched in October 2003. The service is offered by the subsidiary Menara. As well as Inwi (also known as Wana Co.) and Meditel that turned into Orange.

Equity markets
Privatization has stimulated activity on the Casablanca Stock Exchange (Bourse de Casablanca) notably through trade in shares of large former state-owned operation. Founded in 1929, it is one of the oldest stock exchanges in Africa, but it came into reckoning after financial reforms in 1993, making it the third largest in Africa.
The stock market capitalisation of listed companies in Morocco was valued at $75,495 billion in 2007 by the World Bank. That is an increase of 74% compared with the year 2005. Having weathered the global financial meltdown, the Casablanca Stock Exchange is stepping up to its central role of financing the Moroccan economy. Over the next few years, it seeks to double its number of listed companies and more than quadruple its number of investors.

Government finances

Fiscal Policies
Morocco has made great progress toward fiscal consolidation in recent years, under the combined effect of strong revenue performance and efforts to tackle expenditure rigidities, notably the wage bill. The overall fiscal deficit shrank by more than 4 percentage points of GDP during the last four years, bringing the budget close to balance in 2007. However, the overall deficit is projected to widen to 3.5 percent of GDP in 2008, driven by the upward surge in the fiscal cost of Morocco's universal subsidy scheme following the sharp increase in world commodity and oil prices.

Fiscal policy decisions so far have been mostly discretionary, as there is no explicit goal for fiscal policy. Looking forward, the question of a possible anchor for medium-term fiscal policy is worth exploring. Morocco's low social indicators and large infrastructure needs could justify an increase in social spending and public investment. Further, some nominal tax rates remain high by international standards, possibly warranting a lowering of some rates. At the same time, the relatively high level of public debt remains a constraining factor, particularly as heightened attractiveness to investors is a key component of Morocco's strategy of deepening its integration in the global economy.

Morocco has made major progress in recent years to increase economic growth and strengthen the economy's resilience to shocks. The gains reflect sound macroeconomic policies and sustained structural reforms, and are reflected in the gradual improvement in living standards and per capita income.

Debt management
The turnaround in the fiscal performance is particularly noteworthy. Around the start of the 21st century, Morocco's overall deficit stood at 5.3 percent of GDP, and gross total government debt amounted to three-fourths of GDP. In 2007, reflecting a strong improvement in revenue performance and moderate growth in expenditure, the budget was close to balanced. Under the combined effect of a prudent fiscal policy and sizeable privatization receipts, the total debt stock had shrunk by 20 percentage points, and now stands at a little over half of GDP. As a result, perceptions of Morocco's creditworthiness have improved.

Taxation
Tax revenues provide the largest part of the general budget. Taxes are levied on individuals, corporations, goods and services, and tobacco and petroleum products.

External trade

Morocco sends a significant amount of its exports to the European Union. Of its E.U. exports in 2018, 42% went to Spain and 29% went to France. Its main exports to Spain include electronics, clothes, and seafood. The leading origins of goods imported into Morocco as of 2017 are also Spain and France.

In recent years, Morocco has reduced its dependence on phosphate exports, emerging as an exporter of manufactured and agricultural products, and as a growing tourism destination. However, its competitiveness in basic manufactured goods, such as textiles, is hampered by low labour productivity and high wages. Morocco is dependent on imported fuel and its food import requirement can rise substantially in drought years, as in 2007. Although Morocco runs a structural trade deficit, this is typically offset by substantial services earnings from tourism and large remittance inflows from the diaspora, and the country normally runs a small current-account surplus.

Morocco signed in 1996 an agreement of association with the European Union which came into effect in 2000. This agreement, which lies within the scope of the Barcelona Process (euro-Mediterranean partnership) started in 1995 and envisages the progressive implementation of a free trade area planned for 2012.

After a good performance in the 1st half of 2008, exports of goods slowed in the 3rd quarter before plummeting in the 4th quarter (−16.3%), following the fall in foreign sales of phosphates and their derivatives, after a sharp rise in the 1st and 2nd quarters.

Trade imbalance
Morocco's trade imbalance rose from 86 billion to 118 billion dirhams between 2006 and 2007 – a 26.6% increase bringing the total amount to 17% of GDP. The Caisse de Dépôt et de Gestion forecasts that if imports continue to rise faster than exports, the disparity could reach 21% of GDP. Foreign Trade Minister Abdellatif Maâzouz said earlier in September that members of the government have agreed to a plan focused on four major areas: a concerted export development strategy, the regulation of imports, market and economic monitoring, and the adaptation of regulations and working practices. The plan, Maâzouz said, "will enable us to redress the external trade situation and to reduce Morocco's trade deficit." The minister added that he expects to see a reversal of the imbalance by 2010.

International agreements
Morocco was granted an "advanced status" from the EU in 2008, shoring up bilateral trade relations with Europe. Among the various free trade agreements that Morocco has ratified with its principal economic partners, are The Euro-Mediterranean free trade area agreement with the European Union with the objective of integrating the European Free Trade Association at the horizons of 2012; the Agadir Agreement, signed with Egypt, Jordan, and Tunisia, within the framework of the installation of the Greater Arab Free Trade Area; the US-Morocco Free Trade Agreement with United States which came into force on 1 January 2006, and lately the agreement of free exchange with Turkey. (See section below)

Investment

Morocco has become an attractive destination for European investors thanks to its relocation sites "Casashore" and "Rabatshore", and to the very rapid cost escalation in Eastern Europe. The offshoring sector in Morocco is of great importance as it creates high-level jobs that are generally accompanied by an influx of Moroccan immigrants. Noting however that human resources remain the major concern for companies seeking to gain a foothold in Morocco. In this regard, it has been deemed an important decision of the Moroccan government to accelerate training in the required disciplines.

In a bid to promote foreign investments, Morocco in 2007 adopted a series of measures and legal provisions to simplify procedures and secure appropriate conditions for projects launching and completing. Foreign trade minister, Abdellatif Maazouz cited that these measures include financial incentives and tax exemptions provided for in the investment code and the regional investment centres established to accompany projects.
These measures combined with actions carried out by the Hassan II Fund for Development increased foreign investments in Morocco by $544.7 million in 2007. 20% of these investments came from Islamic countries.

Moroccan officials have heralded a significant increase in the amount of money Moroccan expatriates are sending home. Government efforts are underway to encourage Moroccans living abroad to increase their investments at home, and to allay concerns about bureaucracy and corruption. With money sent home by Moroccan migrants reaching $5.7 billion in 2007, Morocco came in second, behind Egypt, on the recent World Bank list of the top 10 MENA remittance recipient countries. Neighbouring Algeria ($2.9 billion) came in at number five. According to the World Bank, remittances constituted 6.4% of GDP in Morocco in 2020 and amounted to more than $7.4 billion. Despite the COVID-19 pandemic, remittances from Moroccans residing abroad continued in an upward trend.

Foreign direct investment
Foreign Direct Investments in Morocco grew to $2.57 billion in 2007 from $2.4 billion a year earlier to position the country in the fourth rank in Africa among FDI recipients, according to the United Nations Conference on Trade and Development. Although other studies have shown much higher figures.
Expectations for 2008 were promising noting that 72 projects were approved for a global amount of $9.28 billion. These were due to open 40,023 direct and stable job opportunities. However, keeping with the global trend, FDI dropped 29% to €2.4 billion in 2008, the first decline since 2004.

While the recovery of pre-crisis levels very much hinges on the health of the global economy, Morocco has made steps towards becoming a more attractive FDI destination, according to the World Bank's Doing Business 2010 report, ranking second in North African neighbours. The majority of FDI continues to derive from the EU, specifically France. Morocco is also a source of foreign investments. In 2007, it has injected $652 million in projects abroad, which put the kingdom in the third position in Africa.

Investment by country
Most of the FDIs injected in Morocco came from the European Union with France, the major economic partner of the North African kingdom, topping the list with investments worth $1.86 billion, followed by Spain ($783 million), the report said.
The influx of European countries in Morocco's FDI represents 73.5% of the global amount received in 2007. 19.3% of the investments came from Arab countries, whose share in Morocco's FDI showed a marked rise, as they only represented 9.9% of the entire FDIs in 2006. A number of Arab countries, mainly from the Persian Gulf region are involved in large-scale projects in Morocco, including the giant Tanger Med port on the Mediterranean. Morocco remains the preferred destination of foreign investors in the Maghreb region (Algeria, Libya, Mauritania, Morocco and Tunisia), with a total of $13.6 billion between 2001 and 2007, which puts it largely on the top of the list.

Investment by sector
In terms of sectors, tourism has the biggest share of investment with $1.55 billion, that is 33% of the total FDIs, followed by the real estate sector and the industrial sector, with respectively $930 million and $374 million. Moroccan expatriates' share of the FDI stood at $92 million in 2007, up from $57 million in 2006, and they touch mainly the sectors of real estate, tourism and catering, according to the report.

Science and technology

The national system of scientific and technical research is guided by different elements, such as the pronouncements of the king, reports of special commissions, five-year plans, and the creation of a special programme for the support of research. The Moroccan government's Five-Year Plan for 2000–2004 articulated the priority lines for research. The declared objectives of this plan were to align S&T research with socio-economic development priorities. Sectors declared as priority areas were: agriculture, health fisheries, drinking water, geology, mining, energy, environment, information and telecommunications technologies, and transport.

This approach highlighted the need for effective institutional coordination, which enabled different parties to work together around common priority socioeconomic objectives. The private sector is the least active player in research activity in Morocco. The REMINEX Corporation (Research on Mines and Exploitation) is the most prominent research performer in the private sector, and is a subsidiary of Omnium Nord Africain, the largest privately owned mining group in Morocco. The most recent figures available on the number of research staff in Morocco are those provided by the Ministry of National Education, Higher Education, Professional Training and Scientific Research in its 2002–2003 annual report. According to this report, Morocco had 17 390 research staff in 2002–2003. The majority (58%) were employed in the university sector.

Research institutions include the Scientific Institute, founded in 1920 in Rabat, which does fundamental research in the natural sciences, and the Scientific Institute of Maritime Fishing, founded in 1947, in Casablanca, which studies oceanography, marine biology, and topics related to development of the fishing industry. Nine universities and colleges offer degrees in basic and applied sciences. In 1987–97, science and engineering students accounted for 41% of college and university enrollments.

Economy of Western Sahara

Fishing and phosphate mining are the main activities in Moroccan-administered Western Sahara. Fruits and vegetables are grown in the few oases, while nomadic herders keep camels, sheep and goats.

Development of the Northern Region
Historically, the Casablanca-Rabat axis has been more prosperous and has received more government attention than the predominantly mountainous northern provinces and the Western Sahara region. Although the latter region has received government attention since the 1990s because of its phosphate deposits, the northern provinces, which include the Rif Mountains, home to 6 million Moroccans, had been largely neglected. The uneven development among Morocco's regions fueled a cycle of rural-urban migration that has shown no signs of slowing down.

In 1998, the government launched a program to develop the northern region, largely with international help. Spain had shown particular interest in the development of the region, because its underdevelopment has fueled illegal immigration and drug trafficking across the Strait of Gibraltar.

When king Hassan II passed on, his son, Mohammed VI, made it his duty to develop the Northern Region, and especially its biggest city, Tangier.

The state-owned railway company will engage some $755 million in investment in the northern region, including building a railway line between Tangier and Tangier-Med port (43 km), improving the Tangier-Casablanca railway line and modernizing many train stations over the next few years.

Tangier

Before 1956, Tangier was a city with international status. It had a great image and attracted many artists. After Morocco regained control over Tangier, this attention slacked off. Investment was low and the city lost its economic importance. But when Mohammed VI became king in 1999, he developed a plan for the economic revival of Tangier. New developments include a new airport terminal, a soccer stadium with seating for 45,000 spectators, a high-speed train line and a new highway to connect the city with Casablanca. Additionally, a new train station was constructed, called Tanger-Ville.

The creation of a free economic zone increased the economic output of the city significantly. It allowed Tangier to become an industrial pillar of the country. But the biggest investment was the creation of the new port Tanger-Med. It's the largest port in Africa and on the Mediterranean. The city is undergoing an economic boom. This increased the need for a commercial district, Tangier City Center, which was inaugurated in 2016. Since 2012, the city has made it clear that it wants to invested in automobile industry by creating Tangier Automotive city. Today, it is home to the largest Renault car plant in North Africa.

Infrastructure

According to the Global Competitiveness Report of 2019, Morocco Ranked 32nd in the world in terms of Roads, 16th in Sea, 45th in Air and 64th in Railways. This gives Morocco the best infrastructure rankings in the African continent.

Modern infrastructure development, such as ports, airports, and rail links, is a top government priority. To meet the growing domestic demand, the Moroccan government invested more than $15 billion from 2010 to 2015 in upgrading its basic infrastructure.

Morocco has one of the best road systems on the continent. Over the past 20 years, the government has built approximately 1770 kilometers of modern roads, connecting most major cities via toll expressways.  The Moroccan Ministry of Equipment, Transport, Logistics, and Water aims to build an additional 3380 kilometers of expressway and 2100 kilometers of highway by 2030, at an expected cost of $9.6 billion. While focusing on linking the southern provinces notably the cities of Laayoune and Dakhla to the rest of Morocco.

In 2014, Morocco began the construction of the second high-speed railway system in Africa linking the cities of Tangiers and Casablanca. It was inaugurated in 2018 by the King following over a decade of planning and construction by Moroccan national railway company ONCF. It is the first phase of what is planned to eventually be a 1,500 kilometres (930 mi) high-speed rail network in Morocco. an extension of the line to Marrakesh is already being planned.

Morocco also has the largest port in Africa and the Mediterranean called Tanger-Med, which is ranked the 18th in the world with a handling capacity of over 9 million containers. It is situated in the Tangiers free economic zone and serves as a logistics hub for Africa and the world.

Economic inequality
The growth pace that the Moroccan economy witnessed since the beginning of the 1998–2007 decade has generated significant progress in terms of national income, employment and living standards. However, the results obtained show considerable disparities in terms of the distribution of the fruit of this growth, whether between the production factors, the socio-economic groups or the urban and rural areas.  In fact, the national income grew at an average annual rate of 5.5% during the 1998–2007 decade. This improvement in the national income however seems to be insufficient to face up to the discrepancies in terms of living standards and the scale of deficits at the social level.

The real income of the population registered, during the last 10 years, an annual increase of 2.5%, taking into consideration the fluctuations relating the climatic conditions, which mainly affect the most vulnerable populations and their living standards. The national survey on Moroccans' living standards shows that the part of the most well off (10% of the population) in the overall consumption expenses in 2001 reached 12 times that of the most disadvantaged population (10%). Despite the fact that these disparities tend to decrease in urban areas, these data show the importance of the efforts needed to overcome this situation.

Labour
Roughly one-third of the population is employed in agriculture, another one-third make their living in mining, manufacturing, and construction, and the remainder are occupied in the trade, finance, and service sectors. Not included in these estimates is a large informal economy of street vendors, domestic workers, and other underemployed and poorly paid individuals. High unemployment is a problem; the official figure is roughly one-tenth of the workforce, but unofficial estimates are much higher, and—in a pattern typical of most Middle Eastern and North African countries—unemployment among university graduates holding nontechnical degrees is especially high. Several trade unions exist in the country; the largest of these, with nearly 700,000 members, is L'Union Marocaine du Travail, which is affiliated with the International Confederation of Free Trade Unions.

Unemployment
Morocco's unemployment rate, long a cause for concern, has been dropping steadily in 2008, on the back of job growth in services and construction. Further institutional reforms to bolster competitiveness and financial openness are expected to help the trend to continue.

On the whole, the growth rate of the economy will not reduce the unemployment rate
significantly, also taking account of the constant rise in the number of first entrants on the
labour market. The growth level of the last five years did, however, reduce urban
unemployment from 22% in 1999 to 18.3% in 2005, and the national rate from 13.9% in 1999
to 10.8% in 2005. The State High Planning Commission that Morocco's official unemployment rate dropped to 9.1% in Q2 2008, down from 9.6% in Q1. This leaves Morocco with some 1.03m unemployed, compared to 1.06m at the end of March. Unemployment stood at 9.8% at the end of 2007, up 0.1% from the end of 2006.

Urban areas saw particularly strong job growth, and the services and construction sectors were the two leading drivers of job creation. Services generated some 152,000 new jobs, with the business process outsourcing (BPO) and telecoms sector proving particularly dynamic. Meanwhile, government infrastructure projects, as well as heavy private investment in real estate and tourism helped boost the construction sector, which created 80,000 new jobs in the second quarter of 2008.

Evidently, this trend of falling unemployment rates is a positive one. Joblessness has long been a cause for serious concern in North Africa. Morocco has a lower rate than its Maghreb neighbours—Tunisia has a rate of around 13.9%, and in Algeria it is around 12.3%—but the issue is still a pressing one, both for economic and for social reasons. A 2006 government report suggested that the country needed a net increase of 400,000 jobs annually for the next two decades in order to provide enough employment for its people, given the underlying demographic dynamic.

Moreover, with Spanish construction firms facing much harder times, Morocco may soon face the additional challenge of workers returning from across the Gibraltar Straits, potentially putting further pressure on the authorities to create jobs.

With 30.5% of Morocco's population of 34.3m aged 14 or younger, according to the CIA, job creation for the young is one of the government's major priorities. 2007 data indicate that 17.6% of those in the 15–24 age group are unemployed. This rises to around one third in urban areas—rural communities often employ the young in agriculture, including on the family farm, as soon as they leave school, contributing to relatively high youth employment rates (lower levels of official unemployment registration are also a factor).

Energy

Morocco has very few reserves of its own and has been affected by the high oil prices of 2007 and early 2008. The country has to import 96% of its energy requirements and the national oil bill for the first quarter of 2008 was $1.1 billion—69% higher than for the same period in 2007. According to the International Energy Agency (IEA) report 2014, Morocco is highly dependent on imported energy with over 91% of energy supplied coming from abroad. The kingdom is working to diversify its energy sources, especially to develop renewable energy, with a particular focus on wind energy. Solar power and nuclear energy are also part of the strategy, but development of the former has been slow and there has been minimal progress on the latter, aside from an announcement of collaboration with France in 2007.

In November 2009 Morocco announced a solar energy project worth $9 billion which officials said will account for 38 percent of the North African country's installed power generation by 2020. Funding would be from a mix of private and state capital. The ceremony was attended by U.S. Secretary of State Hillary Clinton and the Moroccan king. The project will involve five solar power generation sites across Morocco and will produce 2,000 megawatts of electricity by 2020. Germany has expressed its willingness to participate in the development of Morocco's solar energy project which the country has decided to carry out, as did the World Bank. Germany will also take part in the development of a water-desalination plant.

The government plans to reorganise its subsidy system, which is a heavy burden on government finances. In the short term these subsidies are helping to ease the burden but they cannot keep rising indefinitely, and sooner or later the load will have to be shared out. In the short term, national consumption per capita is expected to rise from the current level of 0.4 tonnes of oil equivalent (toe) to as much as 0.90 toe in 2030, a good indication of development, but a massive challenge as well. The input of renewable energy is a matter of particular importance.

Morocco may have additional hydrocarbon reserves, as many of the country's sedimentary basins have not yet been explored. The Moroccan Office of Hydrocarbons and Mining (ONHYM) has become optimistic about finding additional reserves—particularly offshore—following discoveries in neighboring Mauritania.

Recent activity in Western Sahara, which is believed to contain viable hydrocarbon reserves, has been controversial. In 2001, Morocco granted exploration contracts to TotalEnergies and Kerr-McGee, angering Premier Oil and Sterling Energy, which previously had obtained licenses from the Polisario government. In 2005, the government-in-exile of the Western Sahara invited foreign companies to bid on 12 contracts for offshore exploration, with hopes of awarding production sharing contracts by the end of 2005.

Environment

The shift to an environment-conscious approach in Morocco has brought about scores of investment opportunities, most being in the utility and renewable energy industries. In addition to the rise in sales of photovoltaic panels, the business of wind turbines is also surging despite soaring prices on international markets because of the growing demand. To work towards a programme of sustainable development, a number of technological updates need to be made, including improvements to automobiles, the quality of energy products and increasing the number of renewable energy-producing plants. The government also needs to promote water conservation and efficiency in order to prevent further scarcity. Despite these challenges, Morocco is working to conserve and protect its environment and its efforts were recognised when its Mohammed VI Foundation for Environment won the environmental prize National Energy Globe Award in Brussels in 2007.

While Morocco is already a model of water management in the MENA region, upgrades to its water system under the National Wastewater Management Programme should further improve wastewater treatment and maximise efficient water usage. Authorities are promoting better water rationalisation in agriculture, which uses 80% of water resources, by replacing existing irrigation systems with micro- irrigation and drip networks. A net energy importer, Morocco launched the National Renewable Energy and Efficiency Plan in February 2008 to develop alternative energy to meet 15% of its domestic needs and increase the use of energy-saving methods. It is expected to create more than 40,000 jobs and stimulate over €4.5 billion in investment by 2020. The National Plan for the Development of Solar Thermal Energy, formulated in 2001, aims to install 440,000 solar-powered water heaters by 2012, of which 235,000 are completed.

In May 2009, the World Bank approved a €121m loan to help finance the implementation of the kingdom's solid-waste management programme, which targets a 90% waste disposal rate for urban areas by 2021. The government is taking measures to mitigate the harmful effects of tourism on Morocco's natural resources, while increasing incentives for a growing niche of ecotourism projects. As of January 2008, hotels with good environmental practices will receive a Green Key label as part of a programme by the Mohammed VI Foundation for the Protection of the Environment. Under a ten-year plan for the protection of natural resources, 40,000 to 50,000 ha of forests are replanted annually with indigenous palm trees.

See also
Economy of Africa
Bank Al-Maghrib—Central bank of Morocco
Morocco and the European Union
Investment in Morocco
Economy of Tangier
Economy of Casablanca
Economy of Western Sahara
 United Nations Economic Commission for: Africa & Western Asia

Notes

External links
 
 Kingdom of Morocco—Country Strategy Paper 2003–2005—African Development Bank
 Description of the US-Moroccan FTA
 Final Text of the US-Moroccan FTA
 Description of benefits of the US-Moroccan FTA
 Moroccan-American Trade and Investment Council
 Maroc Entrepreneurs: Association dedicated to the Promotion of Entrepreneurship in Morocco
 Morocco Economic Outlook
 World Bank Summary Trade Statistics Morocco
 Tariffs applied by Morocco as provided by ITC's ITCMarket Access Map , an online database of customs tariffs and market requirements.

 
Economy of the Arab League
African Union member economies
World Trade Organization member economies